Antonio del Aguila Vela y Paz (1480 – 1560) was a Roman Catholic prelate who served as Bishop of Zamora (1546–1560) and Bishop of Guadix (1537–1546).

Biography
Antonio del Aguila Vela y Paz was born in Ciudad Rodrigo, Spain in 1480.
On 11 April 1537, he was appointed during the papacy of Pope Paul III as Bishop of Guadix.
On 9 April 1546, he was appointed during the papacy of Pope Paul III as Bishop of Zamora.
He served as Bishop of Zamora until his death in 1560.

References

External links and additional sources
 (for Chronology of Bishops) 
 (for Chronology of Bishops) 
 (for Chronology of Bishops) 
 (for Chronology of Bishops) 

16th-century Roman Catholic bishops in Spain
Bishops appointed by Pope Paul III
1480 births
1560 deaths